Debbie Rosenberg ( Zuckerberg; born 1969) is an American bridge player.
Rosenberg is a four-time world champion, winning the World Mixed Teams Championship in 2018, the Venice Cup in 2007, the World Women Pairs Championship in 2002, and the World Junior Teams Championship (as Debbie Zuckerberg) in 1991.

Bridge accomplishments

Wins

 World Mixed Teams Championship (1) 2018 
 Venice Cup (1) 2007 
 World Women Pairs Championship (1) 2002
 World Junior Teams Championship (1) 1991 
 North American Bridge Championships (7)
 Grand National Teams  (1) 2017 
 Machlin Women's Swiss Teams (2) 2005, 2011 
 Wagar Women's Knockout Teams (1) 2003 
 Sternberg Women's Board-a-Match Teams (2) 2004, 2011 
 Chicago Mixed Board-a-Match (1) 2002

Runners-up

 North American Bridge Championships (7)
 Freeman Mixed Board-a-Match (1) 2012 
 Wagar Women's Knockout Teams (2) 2004, 2007 
 Sternberg Women's Board-a-Match Teams (4) 2002, 2006, 2009, 2010

References

External links
 

1969 births
Living people
American contract bridge players
Venice Cup players
Date of birth missing (living people)
Place of birth missing (living people)